Alonso Fernández Álvarez (born March 16, 1982) is a Costa Rican fashion model and beauty pageant titleholder who was crowned Mister Costa Rica 2009 and represented Costa Rica at Mister International 2009 but unplaced.

Mister World Model 2007
Alonso entered the Mister World Model 2007 pageant held on November 18, 2006 in Guatemala. He won Mister Congeniality, and placed first runner-up behind Alberto García of Venezuela who won.

Manhunt International 2007
Alonso competed in Manhunt International 2007 held at the new Kangwonland International Convention Centre, Korea on Saturday 10 February 2007 during winter, where he finished as a top-16 semifinalist ranking 7th place and won Mr. Photogenic.

Mister World 2007
Alonso, 24, a month later competed in Mister World 2007 and debuted as Costa Rica's first contestant sent to Mister World where he finished as 3rd runner-up on March 31, 2007, in Sanya, People's Republic of China. He is the highest-placed Mister Costa Rica at Mister World and the first to make the finals. At the end of 2007 Beauty Mania conducted an online all-male pageant where Alonso was voted by viewers as Mister Handsome 2007.

Mister International 2009
At age 27, he competed in Mister International 2009.

References

External links
 

1982 births
Living people
People from San José, Costa Rica
Costa Rican male models
Male beauty pageant winners